"Highness" is a song by British indie rock band Envy & Other Sins from their debut studio album We Leave at Dawn. It was released on 3 March 2008 and peaked at number 65 on the UK Singles Chart.

Formats and track listings
CD single
"Highness" – 
"Orient Express" – 
7" vinyl
"Highness"
"When Saturday Comes"
"You've Got Something"
Digital download
"Highness" –

Chart performance

References

2008 singles
Envy & Other Sins songs
2008 songs